Újezd is a municipality and village in Domažlice District in the Plzeň Region of the Czech Republic. It has about 400 inhabitants.

Administrative parts
The village of Petrovice is an administrative part of Újezd.

Notable people
Jan Sladký Kozina (1652–1695), revolutionary leader of the peasant rebellion

References

Villages in Domažlice District
Chodové